Bondee is a virtual avatar social networking app developed by Singapore-based tech firm, Metadream. It is a platform that users use to express themselves and connect with others by using a personalized figure-style avatar. Launched in January 2023, the app quickly gained popularity in Asia and topped app store charts in several countries.

History and development 
Metadream, an independent Singapore-based tech company, acquired the intellectual property (IP) rights for True.ly in May 2022, then made a "creative and international transformation" and was planned to be rolled out worldwide. It was founded by investors from the United States and Australia, with research and development (R&D) and operational bases in Japan and South Korea, as well as data centers in Singapore, Japan, and the US, to ensure product safety and meet data security requirements. The company has plans to establish regional operation centers in countries such as Thailand and the Philippines to serve local users. On November 15, 2022, it was announced that information technology (IT) startup company, Metadream, would launch Bondee, a figure-style avatar messenger application. The virtual avatar application was then officially launched on January 17, 2023.

Features 
Bondee is a messenger application that allows users to send and receive messages from friends and acquaintances, "express their current mood, condition, situation," or others through a "figure-style" avatar, and "exhibit" it to the other person using the app. It is available on operating systems such as iOS 13.0 and above and Android 8.0 and up versions. Upon opening the app, users would be able to customize their personal "3D virtual" self from a "wide selection" of avatars, hairstyles, clothing, shoes, and accessories; then, they would be redirected to create a virtual space or home with pieces of furniture, fixtures, and fittings. Users can also participate in "virtual" activities such as camping, swinging, dancing, sailing, visiting each other's rooms with friends, and even leaving notes. The "sailing" feature allows users to explore unknown universes to know friends beyond their circle, with at most being able to have up to 50 friends only, create messages in drifting bottles, and win virtual gifts.

Reception 
Bondee topped app store charts in multiple countries and had over five million downloads on Google Play, "record-breaking" seven months faster than Instagram. Since its launch in January 2023, it has gained popularity in Asia and is now considered one of the "most favored" apps in the region as it has achieved the top position in the social networking category on the App Store in several countries, including Singapore, Malaysia, the Philippines, and Thailand. In Japan, it is positioned within the top 10 of its category; however, it has yet to reach the top 10 in South Korea.

The application's graphics have received considerable acclaim, as they are "3D and customizable," allowing users to exhibit and pick their choices, and "lifelike, but not so human-like" that would infuse a feeling of "creepiness."  Its interface was also praised for being "adorable" and was often compared to Animal Crossing, Habbo Hotel, and The Sims for the game's functions. The app is also received "positively" by its users regarding the "fun and aesthetics factor of customizing" their virtual persona and connectivity with friends through "snippets" of one's daily life. It also received mixed to positive reactions wherein the game was said to be "lacking in some features" regarding the ability to play games with friends but is a much more acceptable form of the metaverse.

References

External links 

 Official website

Singaporean brands
2023 establishments in Singapore
2023 software
Mobile software
Social networking services
Android (operating system) software
IOS software